Emanuel Max, after 1876: Ritter von Wachstein (19 October 1810, Janov – 22 February 1901, Prague) was a German-Czech sculptor. His brother was the sculptor Josef Max.

Life 
Max was born into a family of sculptors and woodcarvers and received his first lessons from his father. The academy did not have a sculpture department at that time, so he also studied at the Vienna Academy of Fine Arts with Johann Nepomuk Schaller and Franz Käßmann (1760–1833).

From 1839 to 1849, he lived in Italy, where he improved his knowledge of the old masters and came under the influence of newer masters, such as Antonio Canova and Bertel Thorvaldsen. He also honed his technical skills by carving Carrara marble. When he returned to Prague, he opened his own successful sculpting workshop and got married.

He was named a Knight of the Order of Franz Joseph in 1858 and a member of the Order of the Iron Crown (Class III) in 1875. The following year, he was knighted by Emperor Franz Joseph and given the noble appellation "von Wachstein".

Selected works 
 Statue of Saint Adalbert praying for rain, which won him a fellowship to study in Italy from the Klar Foundation. 
 Monument to Marshal Radetzky, done with the assistance of his brother Josef, from sketches by Christian Ruben.
 Memorial for Karl Egon II in Křivoklát Castle
 Monument to Karl Philipp, Prince of Schwarzenberg at Krásný Dvůr Castle
 Statue of the Archangel Raphael for the chapel at the Institute for the Blind, now in the National Museum.
 Statues of Henri, Duke of Rohan and Godfrey of Bouillon for Sychrov Castle 
 Sculptures on the Charles Bridge. (Pièta; Francis of Assisi as Saint Francis Seraphicus, accompanied by angels; Saint Christopher with the Infant Jesus; Calvary)

References

Further reading 
 Emanuel Max, Zweiundachtzig Lebensjahre. (Eighty-two Years of Life), H. Dominicus, Prague 1893
 Ottův slovník naučný, (Otto's encyclopedia), Max Emanuel, sochař. Vol.16, pg.1017
 Petr Wittlich, Sochařství, in: Praha národního probuzení (Prague, National Awakening) (ed. Emanuel Poche). Panorama, Prague 1980.
 Naděžda Blažíčková-Horová: "Emanuel Max", in: Nová encyklopedie českého výtvarného umění,(New Encyclopedia of Czech Fine Arts), Academia, Prague 1995, Vol.2, pgs.496 - 497. 
 Pavel Vlček et al., Umělecké památky Prahy. Díl I., Staré město. (Artistic Monuments of Prague) 2 vols. Academia, Prague 1996

External links

 Wachstein, Emanuel Max. Zweiundachtzig Lebensjahre digitalized by the Prague National Technical Library
 Zastavení s bratry Maxovými – Documentary from Czech Television on the Max brothers and the Charles Bridge, hosted by Prof. František Dvořák.
 List of works about Emanuel Max at the Czech National Library.

1810 births
1901 deaths
Czech sculptors
Czech male sculptors
German sculptors
German Bohemian people
People from Nový Bor
Burials at Olšany Cemetery